The 2008-09 Biathlon World Cup/Pursuit Women is a biathlon competition for women. It started on Sunday December 7, 2008 in Östersund and is scheduled to finish on Saturday March 28, 2009 in Khanty-Mansiysk. The defending titlist is Sandrine Bailly of France.

Competition format
This is a pursuit competition. The biathletes' starts are separated by their time differences from a previous race, most commonly a sprint race. There are two prone shooting bouts and two standing bouts, in that order. The contestant crossing the finish line first is the winner.

To prevent awkward and/or dangerous crowding of the skiing loops, and overcapacity at the shooting range, World Cup Pursuits are held with only the 60 top ranking biathletes after the preceding race. The biathletes shoot (on a first-come, first-served basis) at the lane corresponding to the position they arrived for all shooting bouts.

Points are awarded for each event, according to each contestant's finish. When all events are completed. the contestant with the highest number of points is declared the season winner.

2007-08 Top 3 Standings

Medal winners

Final standings

References

Biathlon World Cup - Pursuit Women, 2008-09